The Kingdom of Bhutan and the People's Republic of China do not maintain official diplomatic relations, and relations are historically tense. The PRC shares a contiguous border of 470 kilometers with Bhutan, and its territorial disputes with Bhutan have been a source of potential conflict.  Since the 1980s, the two governments have conducted regular talks on border and security issues to reduce tensions.

Background 
Bhutan has long had strong cultural, historical, religious, and economic connections to Tibet. Relations with Tibet were strained when China took over Tibet in the 1950s. Unlike Tibet, Bhutan had no history of being under the suzerainty of China but fell under British suzerainty during the British Raj following the Treaty of Punakha in 1910.

Bhutan's border with Tibet has never been officially recognized, much less demarcated. The Republic of China officially maintains a territorial claim on parts of Bhutan. The territorial claim was maintained by the People's Republic of China after the Chinese Communist Party took control of mainland China in the Chinese Civil War. With the increase in soldiers on the Chinese side of the Sino-Bhutanese border after the 17-point agreement between the Tibetan government and the central government of the PRC, Bhutan withdrew its representative from Lhasa.

The 1959 Tibetan uprising and the 14th Dalai Lama's arrival in neighboring India made the security of Bhutan's border with China a necessity for Bhutan. An estimated 6,000 Tibetans fled to Bhutan and were granted asylum, although Bhutan subsequently closed its border to China, fearing more refugees. 

Bhutan-China relations are constrained also by Bhutan's close relationship with India.

History 
Bhutan has historical ties to Tibet through their culture, history, religion, and economy . However, their relationship became tense after Bhutan supported the British Empire and the British invasion of Tibet. With the signing of an agreement between the People's Republic of China and the Tibetan locals, and the deployment of troops on the border between China and Bhutan, Bhutan withdrew its representatives in the People's Republic of China from Lhasa. After the 1959 Tibetan riots and the arrival of the Dalai Lama in neighbouring India, some 6,000 Tibetans fled to Bhutan and were granted asylum. Bhutan closed its border with China, afraid that there would be more refugees.
The Indian government constrains Bhutan and needs India's approval when developing diplomatic relations with other countries. Bhutan has no diplomatic relations with any of the five permanent members of the UN Security Council. It is the only UN member state worldwide that has not established diplomatic relations with either the People's Republic of China or the Republic of China. It is the only country of the PRC's bordering neighbors that do not have diplomatic relations with them.

Boundary Issues 
With the entry of the People's Liberation Army into Tibet, some Tibetan settlements in western Tibet, formerly controlled by the Bhutanese government, came under the control of the People's Republic of China. While some sources believe that the Bhutan-China border was settled in a secret agreement during 1961, neither country has ever publicly acknowledged such an agreement. In 1998, the two countries signed a peace and tranquility agreement, although border disputes remain.  A 2002 official statement by the King of Bhutan to the National Assembly, specifies that there are still four disputed areas between Bhutan and China.

Mitigation 
In 1974, Bhutan invited Ma Muming, Charge d'Affaires of the Chinese Embassy in India, to attend the coronation of the fourth Bhutanese King Jigme Singye Wangchuck. In 1983, Chinese Foreign Minister Wu Xueqian and Bhutanese Foreign Minister Dawa Tsering held talks in New York on establishing bilateral relations. In 1984, China and Bhutan began direct negotiations on the border dispute. Since then, the two countries have taken turns holding border meetings in their respective capitals.

China and Bhutan signed a bilateral agreement on their border disputes at the 12th boundary meeting in 1998. China reaffirmed its respect for Bhutan's sovereignty and territorial integrity in the agreement. The two sides also proposed the Five Principles of Peaceful Coexistence. However, China later built roads in the territory claimed by Bhutan, and China was accused of violating the agreement and provoking tension. In 2002, China submitted some files to prove its sovereignty over the disputed land, and the two sides reached a provisional agreement after consultation.

In June 2012, then-Chinese Premier Wen Jiabao met with Bhutanese Prime Minister Jigme Thinley, which was the first meeting between the two countries heads of government.

On October 14, 2021, Chinese Assistant Foreign Minister Wu Jianghao and Bhutanese Foreign Minister Thandit Dorji signed a Memorandum of Understanding on the "Three-Step Roadmap" for accelerating the Sino-Bhutan border negotiations by video in Beijing and Thimphu, respectively.

However, according to Indian geopolitical expert Brahma Chellaney , Xi Jinping is taking his South China Sea strategy to the Himalayas. Several new Chinese villages have crept into internationally recognized Bhutanese territory, which he sees as proof that China continues to use its South China Sea strategy to unilaterally change the status quo and coerce Bhutan into accepting its part and military incursions.

Economic and Trade Relations 
In 2011, the bilateral trade volume was US$17 million. In 2012, the bilateral trade volume was US$15.62 million, down 10.5% year-on-year. In 2013, the bilateral trade volume was US$17.414 million, up 11.5% year-on-year. In 2015, the trade volume between China and Bhutan was US$10.029 million, down 8.2% year-on-year, of which China's exports were US$9.949 million, down 10.5%, with imports worth US$350,000, up 2.35 times year-on-year. By the end of 2015, the number of Bhutan's investment projects in China was 3, with no input. China had no direct investment in Bhutan, but during the same period, China signed US$11.06 million in engineering contracts in Bhutan, with a completed turnover of US$1.02 million.

The two countries' audit departments exchanged visits in 2001 and 2002, and in April 2005, Assistant Minister of Culture Ding Wei led a Chinese art troupe to Bhutan for its first successful performance. In June 2006, the Chairman of the Anti-Corruption Commission of Bhutan visited Hong Kong. In August 2009, the Minister of Home Affairs and Culture of Bhutan, Minjur Dorji, came to China to attend the "Roundtable of Asian Ministers of Culture" held in Ordos, Inner Mongolia.

In September 2010, the Living Buddha of Songchu in Bhutan made a pilgrimage to the Tibet Autonomous Region. In November, Jigyel Ugyen Wangchuck, Prince of Bhutan and President of the Bhutan Olympic Committee, attended the opening ceremony of the 16th Asian Games in Guangzhou. In November 2015, Bhutanese government officials visited China to observe the Sino-Bhutan soccer match and visited Beijing and Lhasa. In October 2016, the Minister of Agriculture of the Kingdom of Bhutan, Yoshi Dorji, led an interdepartmental delegation to visit China.

In July 2018, Deputy Foreign Minister Kong Hyun-woo visited Bhutan and held talks with the current and former Kings of Bhutan, Prime Minister Lotay Tshering and Foreign Minister Tandi Dorji.

See also 

 Bhutan–India relations
 Five Fingers of Tibet, foreign policy of the PRC which calls for the annexation of, among other territories, Bhutan
 List of territorial disputes#Asia

References

Further reading
 
 

 
China
Bilateral relations of China